Petter Furberg (15 December 1923 in Sande – 22 June 1999) was a Norwegian politician for the Labour Party.

He was elected to the Norwegian Parliament from Vestfold in 1969, and was re-elected on two occasions.

On the local level he was a member of Horten city council from 1953 to 1971. He chaired the municipal party chapter from 1971 to 1974.

From 1981 to 1990 he was appointed Auditor General of Norway.

References

1923 births
1991 deaths
Members of the Storting
Labour Party (Norway) politicians
Vestfold politicians
People from Horten
Auditors general of Norway
20th-century Norwegian politicians